Cyprus Airways (Greek: Κυπριακές Αερογραμμές) is the flag carrier airline of Cyprus, based at Larnaca International Airport. It commenced operations on 1 June 2017.

History
Cyprus Airways resumed operations in 2016 after winning the rights to use the trademark of the Cyprus Airways. The airline's logo incorporates an olive branch, the main symbol of Cyprus. On 4 March 2017, the airline conducted its proving flight from Larnaca International Airport to Heraklion International Airport with an Airbus A319-100, as part of the procedure to obtain the certificate. On 14 March 2017, it was announced that the airline had obtained the Air operator certificate from the Cypriot Department of Civil Aviation, marking the start of commercial service for the airline.

Since then, 900,000 passengers travelled to and from Cyprus with Cyprus Airways. In 2019 alone 400,000 travelers were carried by Cyprus Airways.

Destinations 
As of July 2022, Cyprus Airways serves the following destinations:

Codeshare agreements
Cyprus Airways codeshares with the following airlines:
 airBaltic
 Blue Air
 Bulgaria Air
 Qatar Airways
 S7 Airlines

Cyprus Airways also has an interline agreement with Sky Express.

Fleet

Current fleet

As of October 2022, the Cyprus Airways fleet consists of the following aircraft:

The airline's first aircraft was an Airbus A319-100, with registration code 5B-DCW. The aircraft was a former S7 - Siberia Airlines aircraft, in a Y144 configuration, and was used for the carrier's proving flight. The aircraft was painted in the carrier's initial livery. The aircraft stayed with the airline from December 2016, up until November 2021, when it was moved to St. Athan Airfield in the United Kingdom, to be stored, and later scrapped, at 22 years of service.

The carrier's second aircraft was also an Airbus A319-100, with registration code 5B-DCX. Also a former S7 - Siberia Airlines aircraft, in a Y144 configuration, it entered the airline's fleet in May 2018. It was also painted in the carrier's first colors. The aircraft was with the airline until October 2022, when at 23 years of service, it was moved to St. Athan Airfield in the United Kingdom, to be stored.

Cyprus Airways placed an order for three Airbus A320-200 in order to expand their fleet. The first one was delivered to the airline in May 2022. The aircraft, with registration 5B-DDQ, had a Y180 configuration, and was a former member of Flynas, a Saudi Arabian airline. The aircraft was painted all white, and did not have a livery, until late November 2022, when it was painted in the carrier's new colors.

The second Airbus A320-200 was delivered to the airline in July 2022. Having registration 5B-DDR, and in a Y180 configuration, the aircraft is also a former Flynas fleet member, and was also white with no livery upon delivery. The aircraft remained in the white state until October 2022, when the airline's new livery was introduced. The aircraft was then painted in the carrier's new colors.

The third ordered aircraft has not been delivered to the carrier yet. It is a former member of the Air France fleet.

Retired fleet

Livery 

The first livery of Cyprus Airways was introduced in 2016, and featured two shades of green on the fuselage. The airline's logo, the olive branch, was displayed on the aircraft's tail, in shades of green, and on the engines, in a dark green color. The old Cyprus Airways logo, the mouflon, is also featured by the front doors of the aircraft, on the cockpit's side. The airline's name is also written in big letters by the front doors, on the cabin side. This first livery was painted on Cyprus Airways' two Airbus A319-100 aircraft. The first livery was not loved by everyone, and many criticized it by saying that the two shades of green chosen gave the aircraft a faded look.

The two Airbus A320-200 delivered to Cyprus Airways in 2022 remained unpainted and white for some time, which lead to speculation that a new livery might be on the works. In late October 2022, the newest addition to Cyprus Airways' fleet, the Airbus A320-100 with registration 5B-DDR, arrived at Larnaca International Airport "Glafcos Clerides", painted in the carrier's brand new livery. Upon arrival, the aircraft was greeted with a water salute. This was the airline's way of revealing the new livery.

The carrier's new livery, introduced in October 2022, follows the Eurowhite scheme, where most of the fuselage is white, and the tail wears the carrier's colors. In the case of Cyprus Airways, the fuselage is mostly white. However, the tail and back side of the fuselage have a light green color. The tail features the olive branch in shades of green, and a bigger, white shade of the olive branch behind it. The Cyprus Airways name is still featured in shades of green on the cabin side of the front doors. In contrast to the first livery, however, the mouflon logo and the olive branch have changed positions. The olive branch in a dark green color is now featured on the cockpit side of the front doors of the aircraft. The yellow mouflon has now been moved onto the plane's engines, reminding of the old Cyprus Airways livery design, which also featured the mouflon on the engines.

In late November 2022, 5B-DDQ, the airline's first Airbus A320-200, was also painted in the airline's new colors. However, 5B-DDQ's new livery had the engines painted in a light green color, in contrast with 5B-DDR's livery, on which the engines are white. The mouflon is still present on the engines. This change signifies a new revision of the airline's livery. However, it is not known whether or not this change will be followed on 5B-DDR, or whether the airline's awaited third Airbus A320-200 will follow the first or the second revision of the new livery.

References

 Cyprus Aircraft Register As At 30 June 2017, retrieved 14 July 2017 via

External links

 
Airlines of Cyprus
Airlines established in 2016
2016 establishments in Cyprus